Dham Talwandi Khurd is the seat of an Ashram (community) established on the outskirts of the city of Ludhiana in the state of Punjab in Northern India. Khurd and Kalan Persian language word which means small and Big respectively when two villages have same name then it is distinguished as Kalan means Big and Khurd means Small used with Village Name.

Dham Talwandi Khurd is managed by the Swami Ganganand Bhuriwale Trust. It is located about 30 kilometers from the Ludhiana city center.

History
Talwandi Khurd was established in 1905 by followers of the Garib Dassi sect.
http://dhamtalwandi.com/about.php

SGB Children's Home
SGB Children's Home was established under the patronage of Swami Shankera Nand jee Bhuriwale.  SGB Children's Home provides long term care to orphan/abandoned children. 

Social worker Jagdeep Singh worked with SOS Children's Villages before coming to assist in setting up the SGB Children's Home. He played a key role in setting up SOS Children's Villages in Punjab (Rajpura, for children affected by a long spell of social disturbance in Punjab) and in Gujarat (for children rendered homeless by a devastating earthquake in January 2001).
The ideology of the SGB Children's Home is based on a sacred principle that every child has right to live and grow in a family. A group of 7-8 children live under care of a dedicated woman who has devoted her life for the cause of needy children. A major part of the organization work is shared by Bibi Jasbir Kaur, Mr. Kuldip Singh and Ms. Ramanjot Kaur.

SGB International Organization, the parent institution of the SGB Children's Home is a recognized and authorized agency by the State and Central governments for both In-country and inter-country adoption of children.

This organization also runs a grade 12 level school, St. Kabir Academy, recognized by the Central Board of Secondary Education (CBSE). Focus of this school is primarily to provide education to rural children who would otherwise find difficult to get access to quality education.

External links
 About Dham Talwandi Khurd
 History of Dham Talwandi Khurd

Buildings and structures in Ludhiana